Avery Garrett (August 3, 1916 – April 15, 1988) was an American politician in the state of Washington. He served as Mayor of Renton from 1969 to 1976. He also served in the Washington House of Representatives from 1959 to 1969 for district 47 and from 1977 to 1985 for district 11, and in the Senate from 1985 to 1988.

References

1916 births
1988 deaths
Democratic Party Washington (state) state senators
Democratic Party members of the Washington House of Representatives
20th-century American politicians